Xue Juan (born 20 October 1989) is a Chinese para table tennis player. She won two gold medals at the 2016 Summer Paralympics.

Like many of her teammates, Xue was a polio survivor from Pizhou who attended New Hope Center as a child. That's where coach Heng Xin developed her into a star.

References

1989 births
Living people
Table tennis players at the 2016 Summer Paralympics
Paralympic medalists in table tennis
Medalists at the 2016 Summer Paralympics
Chinese female table tennis players
Paralympic gold medalists for China
Paralympic table tennis players of China
Para table tennis players from Pizhou
People with polio
Table tennis players at the 2020 Summer Paralympics